Augusto Brandt (1892 in Puerto Cabello – 1942 in Caracas) was a Venezuelan composer and violinist.

Early life

The son of German immigrants, and younger brother of writer Carlos Brandt, he had piano lessons with Ana Jhan Wittestone as a child, and composed his first pieces at the age of six. From 1903, he studied violin in Caracas. In the municipal theatre of his town, in 1910, he composed a triumphal march for the centenary of the independence of Venezuela.

Career
With a scholarship of 60 bolivares from the Puerto Cabello local government official Lopez Bello, on December 23, 1909, he went to Belgium. There, he was a pupil of César Thomson at the Brussels Conservatory, from which he graduated with first prize in the violin. He then lived in New York City, where he was first violinist of the orchestra at the Paramount Theater. Later, he joined the orchestra of the radio station WOR. Here, he initially served as first violinist, and later as a solo violinist and conductor.

Later life
After the death of the dictator Juan Vicente Gómez, Brandt returned to Venezuela, where he and his brother Carlos Brandt, earned prestige due to their commitment to human rights.

Works

Jesús aplaca la tormenta, 1898
Marcha Triunfal, 1910
Joropo en Concierto - for Violin
Preludio for piano en fa menor
Himno Panamericano, 1934
Marcha Solemne
Bolívar en el Panteón
Dulce Ensueño
Recuerdos de mi Tierra, waltz
Canción de Cuna, waltz
Tu partida, waltz
Nocturne, waltz
Desfile Militar, march
Himno Bolivariano 
Súplica, waltz
El adiós de las gaviotas, waltz
Besos en mis sueños, waltz
Adiós a las Gaviotas, Sonata-Fantasia - for Piano

References

Dao, Elias. Cronicas y Portenos. 1967
Cordido Roo, J.A. Tu Violin. 1908

1892 births
1942 deaths
Venezuelan composers
Male composers
Venezuelan violinists
Male violinists
20th-century composers
20th-century violinists
20th-century male musicians